John Harris (born 1954) is an Irish linguist and Emeritus Professor of Linguistics at University College London. He is best known for his works on phonetics and phonology.
A festschrift in his honor titled Sonic Signatures edited by Geoff Lindsey and Andrew Nevins was published in 2017.

Books
Phonological variation and change: studies in Hiberno-English, Cambridge University Press 1985
English sound structure, Wiley-Blackwell 1994

References

External links
John Harris

Linguists from the United Kingdom
British phonologists
Academics of University College London
Alumni of the University of Edinburgh
Phoneticians
1954 births
Living people
Linguists from Ireland